The 2013 Challenger Banque Nationale de Rimouski was a professional tennis tournament played on indoor hard courts. It was the 7th edition of the tournament and part of the 2013 ATP Challenger Tour, offering a total of $35,000 in prize money. It took place in Rimouski, Canada between March 18 and March 24, 2013.

Singles main-draw entrants

Seeds

1 Rankings are as of March 11, 2013

Other entrants
The following players received wildcards into the singles main draw:
 Hugo Di Feo
 Filip Peliwo
 Milan Pokrajac
 Brayden Schnur

The following players received entry from the qualifying draw:
 Maxime Authom
 Rik de Voest
 Adam El-Mihdawy
 Hiroki Moriya

Champions

Singles

 Rik de Voest def.  Vasek Pospisil, 7–6(8–6), 6–4

Doubles

 Sam Groth /  John-Patrick Smith def.  Philipp Marx /  Florin Mergea, 7–6(7–5), 7–6(9–7)

External links
Official website

Challenger Banque Nationale de Rimouski
Challenger de Drummondville
Challenger Banque Nationale de Rimouski
Challenger Banque Nationale de Rimouski
Challenger Banque Nationale de Rimouski